Bermersheim vor der Höhe is an Ortsgemeinde – a municipality belonging to a Verbandsgemeinde, a kind of collective municipality – in the Alzey-Worms district in Rhineland-Palatinate, Germany.

Geography

Location 
As a winegrowing centre, Bermersheim vor der Höhe lies in Germany's biggest winegrowing district, in the middle of Rhenish Hesse. It belongs to the Verbandsgemeinde of Alzey-Land, whose seat is in Alzey.

History 
The earliest documentary evidence of the name of Bermersheim dates from the year 768, in connection with the sale of an estate to Lorsch Abbey.

The words vor der Höhe (meaning “before the Heights”) were added to the name with effect from 1 April 1971.

Politics

Municipal council 
The council is made up of 8 council members, who were elected by proportional representation at a municipal election held on 7 June 2009, with the honorary mayor as chairman.

The municipal election held on 7 June 2009 yielded the following results:

Mayors 
 Volker Herberg (.... - 2004)
 Werner Wagner (2004–2014)
 Ute Fillinger (since 2014

Culture and sightseeing

Buildings 
Hildegard of Bingen’s baptismal church is located in Bermersheim vor der Höhe.

Economy and infrastructure 
Winegrowing

Notable people

Hildegard of Bingen (1098–1179), abbess, writer, composer, philosopher, Christian mystic, visionary and polymath

References 

Rhenish Hesse
Alzey-Worms